Avgustovka is a rural locality (a selo) and the administrative center of Avgustovka Rural Settlement of Bolshechernigovsky District, Samara Oblast, Russia. The population was 2628 as of 2016. There are 37 streets.

Geography 
Avgustovka is located 21 km north of Bolshaya Chernigovka (the district's administrative centre) by road. Pekilyanka is the nearest rural locality.

References 

Rural localities in Samara Oblast